Jhoot (Lie), is a Pakistani television drama series that was aired on 13 May 2016 in Hum TV. It stars Bushra Ansari, Imran Ashraf, Kamran Jeelani, and Mansha Pasha. It airs every Friday at 8:00 pm replacing Maan. It ended on 7 October 2016, preceded by Gypsy which was renamed as Dil Banjaara.

Plot 

The story is of Saleha (Bushra Ansari) and how a lie changes her entire identity, affects her life choices and her decisions for her family. Will her excessively careful nature ruin her children's nature? She has a son Waqar (Kamran Jeelani) and a daughter Zara (Mansha Pasha) while her husband lives abroad. Sadaf (Mira Sethi) and Waqar like each other, Saleha catches them together and emotionally blackmails Waqar into getting engaged to her niece Farah. Saleha also breaks Farahs engagement and agrees to get Waqar married to Sadaf. Saleha places a condition that Sadaf's elder brother had to come get marries to Zara. They refuse this condition and Waqar and Sadaf are separated. Many years pass Zara and Waqar remain unmarried due to Saleha.

Jamal (Imran Ashraf) and his family move a rented house in the defence area. Jamal and Zara get married.

Cast 
 Bushra Ansari as Saleha
 Imran Ashraf as Jamal
 Kamran Jilani as Waqar
 Mansha Pasha as Zara
 Mira Sethi as Sadaf
 Akbar Islam as Junaid (Saleha's brother)
 Nargis Rasheed as Ghazala (Jamal's mother)
 Aisha Khan as Iqra (Jamal's sister)
 Rimsha Akmal
 Farhan Awan
 Akbar Khan
 Fareeha Sheikh
 Shaista Jaheen as Sadaf's mother
 Anwar Iqbal as Farooq
Shahzad Malik
 Awais Waseer as Zaheer (Sadaf's brother)
 Fariha
 Rehana Kalim
 Mariam Mirza as Safiyya (Saleha's sister)
 Arshad Ghori
 Faiza Gillani
 Kamal Khan
 Fouzia Mushtaq as Saleha's relative
 Humaira Bano as Amna (Farooq's sister)
 Sohail Masood
 Farah Zeba
 Heem Fatima
 Shazia Qaiser
 Kiran Shahid
 Akhtar Ghazali
 Nighat Sultana
 Ash Khan
 Safiya Sohail

Original Soundtrack 

The song of Jhoot is sung by famous singers, Raheel Fayyaz & Bina Khan. It is produced by Moomal Shunaid under her house of Moomal Entertainment.

See also 
 List of programs broadcast by Hum TV
 2016 in Pakistani television

References

External links 
 Hum TV Website

Pakistani drama television series
Hum TV original programming
2016 Pakistani television series debuts